Dundasite is a rare lead aluminium carbonate mineral. The mineral is named after the type locality, Dundas, Tasmania, Australia. The mineral was first discovered in the Adelaide Proprietary Mine. Dundasite was first described by William Frederick Petterd in 1893.

Dundasite is an uncommon secondary mineral occurring in the oxidized zone of lead ore deposits. It commonly overgrows crocoite. It may also be overgrown by yellow cerussite. It may be associated with cerussite, plattnerite, azurite, malachite, pyromorphite, mimetite, beudantite, duftite, crocoite, gibbsite, allophane and limonite.

Besides its type location on Tasmania, the mineral has also been found in New Zealand, Mainland Australia, China, Belgium, Germany, France, Greece, United Kingdom, Ireland, Italy, Austria, Czech Republic, Namibia, and the US.

References 

Carbonate minerals
Orthorhombic minerals
Minerals in space group 51